Walter Campbell Smith (1887–1988), later formally Campbell-Smith, was a British mineralogist and petrologist. Awarded the Murchison Medal in 1945.

He was Keeper of  Mineralogy at the British Museum 1937-1952.

20th-century British geologists
British centenarians
Men centenarians
1887 births
1988 deaths